Brachodes keredjella is a moth of the family Brachodidae. It is found in the central Elburz Mountains of Iran.

References

Moths described in 1953
Brachodidae